Demaray is a surname. Notable people with the surname include:

Arthur E. Demaray (1887–1958), American government administrator 
Elizabeth Demaray, American artist
John G. Demaray (1930–2015), American medievalist